Lesnoy is a rural locality (a settlement) in Tarbagataysky District, Republic of Buryatia, Russia. The population was 6 as of 2010. There is 1 street.

Geography 
Lesnoy is located 60 km northeast of Tarbagatay (the district's administrative centre) by road. Nikolayevsky is the nearest rural locality.

References 

Rural localities in Tarbagataysky District